The 2012 NCAA Bowling Championship was the ninth annual tournament to determine the national champion of women's NCAA collegiate ten-pin bowling. The tournament was played at Freeway Lanes in Wickliffe, Ohio from April 13–14, 2012.

Maryland Eastern Shore defeated Fairleigh Dickinson in the championship match, 4 games to 2 (222–204, 236–215, 167–249, 208–168, 170–223, 203–176), to win their third, and second consecutive, national title. The Hawks were coached by Kristina Frahm, who also the Most Outstanding Player of UMES' 2011 championship team.

Maryland Eastern Shore's T'nia Falbo was named the tournament's Most Outstanding Player. Falbo, along with four other bowlers, also comprised the All Tournament Team.

Qualification
Since there is only one national collegiate championship for women's bowling, all NCAA bowling programs (whether from Division I, Division II, or Division III) were eligible. A total of 8 teams were invited to contest this championship, which consisted of a modified double-elimination style tournament.

Tournament bracket 
Site: Freeway Lanes, Wickliffe, Ohio
Host: Mid-American Conference

{{8TeamBracket-2Elim |groups=y |RD3-legs=2
| RD1=Rounds 1–2April 13
| RD2=Rounds 2–3April 13
| RD3=Rounds 4–5April 13–14
| RD4=ChampionshipApril 14

| RD2-group1=Upper Bracket
| RD2-group2=Lower Bracket

| RD1-seed01=1
| RD1-team01=Vanderbilt
| RD1-score01=4
| RD1-seed02=8
| RD1-team02=Valparaiso
| RD1-score02=1

| RD1-seed03=5
| RD1-team03=UMES
| RD1-score03=4
| RD1-seed04=4
| RD1-team04=Sacred Heart
| RD1-score04=3

| RD1-seed05=8
| RD1-team05=Valparaiso
| RD1-score05=4
| RD1-seed06=4
| RD1-team06=Sacred Heart
| RD1-score06=3

| RD1-seed07=3
| RD1-team07=Fairleigh Dickinson
| RD1-score07=4
| RD1-seed08=6
| RD1-team08=Arkansas State
| RD1-score08=1

| RD1-seed09=7
| RD1-team09=Central Missouri
| RD1-score09=0
| RD1-seed10=2
| RD1-team10=Nebraska
| RD1-score10=4

| RD1-seed11=6
| RD1-team11=Arkansas State
| RD1-score11=4
| RD1-seed12=7
| RD1-team12=Central Missouri
| RD1-score12=3

| RD2-seed01=1
| RD2-team01=Vanderbilt
| RD2-score01=1½
| RD2-seed02=5
| RD2-team02=UMES
| RD2-score02=3½

| RD2-seed03=2
| RD2-team03=Nebraska| RD2-score03=4| RD2-seed04=8
| RD2-team04=Valparaiso
| RD2-score04=3

| RD2-seed05=3
| RD2-team05=Fairleigh Dickinson| RD2-score05=4| RD2-seed06=2
| RD2-team06=Nebraska
| RD2-score06=3

| RD2-seed07=1
| RD2-team07=Vanderbilt| RD2-score07=4| RD2-seed08=6
| RD2-team08=Arkansas State
| RD2-score08=2

| RD3-seed01=5
| RD3-team01=UMES| RD3-score01-1=4| RD3-score01-2=–
| RD3-seed02=2
| RD3-team02=Nebraska
| RD3-score02-1=1
| RD3-score02-2=–

| RD3-seed03=3
| RD3-team03=Fairleigh Dickinson| RD3-score03-1=0
| RD3-score03-2=4| RD3-seed04=1
| RD3-team04=Vanderbilt
| RD3-score04-1=4| RD3-score04-2=3

| RD4-seed01=5
| RD4-team01=UMES| RD4-score01=4| RD4-seed02=3
| RD4-team02=Fairleigh Dickinson
| RD4-score02=3
}}

Championship Match

All-tournament teamT'nia Falbo, Maryland Eastern Shore''' (Most Outstanding Player)
Joely Carrillo, Fairleigh Dickinson
Natalie Cortese, Valparaiso
Kayla Johnson, Nebraska
Amanda LaBossiere, Arkansas State

References

NCAA Bowling Championship
Mid-American Conference
2012 in American sports
2012 in bowling
2012 in sports in Ohio
April 2012 sports events in the United States